Roxane Semadini is a tap dancer from Toulon in southern France, active in the United States. She was nicknamed 'Butterfly' by Jimmy Slyde, and performs as Roxane Butterfly. In 2002 she was included in a list of '25 to watch' published by Dance Magazine.
  
From 1998 she choreographed performances of her all-woman ensemble BeauteeZ´n The Beat. 
 
In 2005 she received funding from Barcelona American fundings to work on her flamenco-tap fusión project Djellaba Groove. 

She founded the Jimmy Slyde Institute in Barcelona.

References

Further reading 

An American Dance Form Fluent in Many Languages. The New York Times, March 10, 2008
Hoofers Pay Tribute to the Tapper Jimmy Slyde.New York Times'', April 18, 2010

External links 
 Official website

Living people
French female dancers
Tap dancers
People from Toulon
Year of birth missing (living people)